FK Králův Dvůr is a football club located in Králův Dvůr, Czech Republic. It currently plays in the Bohemian Football League, which is in the third tier of Czech football system.

The club, playing in the third division, caused an upset in the second round of the 2012–13 Czech Cup by dumping out top flight side 1. FK Příbram.

References

External links
  

Football clubs in the Czech Republic
Association football clubs established in 1949
Beroun District
1949 establishments in Czechoslovakia